Dixton Manor is a Grade II*-listed 16th-century manor house in the south of Alderton parish, Gloucestershire, England.

The manor was built for John Higford in 1555. In the nineteenth century, it was acquired by Samuel Gist. In 1962, it was purchased by Charles Hambro, Baron Hambro.

It has been listed Grade II* by English Heritage since 4 July 1960.

References

Grade II* listed buildings in Gloucestershire
Houses completed in 1555
Hambro family